The 2021 Ohio Valley Conference men's basketball tournament was the final event of the 2020–21 NCAA Division I men's basketball season in the Ohio Valley Conference. The tournament was held March 3 through March 6, 2021 at the Ford Center in Evansville, Indiana.

Seeds
Only the top eight teams in the conference qualified for the tournament. Teams were seeded by record within the conference, with a tiebreaker system to seed teams with identical conference records.

Schedule

Bracket

* denotes number of overtime periods

References

Tournament
Ohio Valley Conference men's basketball tournament
Basketball competitions in Evansville, Indiana
College basketball tournaments in Indiana
Ohio Valley Conference men's basketball tournament
Ohio Valley Conference men's basketball tournament